Christian Deublerh (born December 6, 1880, date of death unknown) was a German gymnast who represented the United States. He competed in four events at the 1904 Summer Olympics.

References

External links
 

1880 births
Year of death missing
American male artistic gymnasts
Olympic gymnasts of the United States
Gymnasts at the 1904 Summer Olympics
People from Bad Mergentheim
Sportspeople from Stuttgart (region)
German emigrants to the United States